Warder Cresson (July 13, 1798 – November 6, 1860), later known as Michael Boaz Israel ben Abraham, was an American diplomat. He was appointed the first U.S. Consul to Jerusalem in 1844.

Biography
Warder Cresson was born in Philadelphia, Pennsylvania to Quaker parents John Elliott (1773–1814) and Mary Cresson. He was descended from Pierre Cresson, one of the early settlers of Haarlem, New York, whose grandson, Solomon, migrated to Philadelphia in the early 18th century.

Cresson married Elizabeth Townsend, with whom he had six children, and ran a farm in Gwynedd, Pennsylvania, a suburb of Philadelphia.

In 1830 he published a pamphlet entitled Babylon the Great Is Falling! The Morning Star, or Light from on High, in which he deplored the extravagance and evil tendencies of the times, and exhorted all Quakers to lead a better and less wayward life. He went through a period of strong religious upheaval, joining a series of sects that appeared to him to represent true religion.

In 1840, he met Isaac Leeser and became deeply interested in Judaism. Cresson was also influenced by the writings of Mordecai Manuel Noah, who believed that the Jews would soon return to live in Palestine, their national homeland. In 1844, he was appointed the first U.S. consul in Jerusalem. He converted to Judaism in 1848 and returned to Philadelphia to arrange his affairs prior to moving permanently to Jerusalem. During this time, he was a regular attendant at the Mikveh Israel synagogue, taking part in Jewish communal life, and rigorously observing Jewish religious law. In 1851, he published The Key of David: David the True Messiah, or the Anointed of the God of Jacob.

In 1852, after a trial in which his wife sought to declare him insane, he returned to Jerusalem and actively supported efforts then being made for the agricultural regeneration of Palestine.  In the fall,  he announced his intention of establishing an agricultural colony in Emek Refaim. In March 1853, he began writing for The Occident and sent a circular from Jerusalem soliciting assistance for his projects. Though interspersed with theology and quotations from the Bible, the circular is one that only a practical farmer and educator could have produced. Cresson believed that the prevailing distress could be relieved by the establishment of agricultural colonies, and that oppressed Jews from all parts of the world should return to Zion.

Cresson married a Sephardic Jewish woman, Rachel Moledano, with whom he had three children, Abigail, Ruth, and David Ben-Zion, all of whom died young. He lived the life of a pious Oriental Jew, dressed as a native Sephardi, and became a prominent leader of the community. He was buried on the Mount of Olives.

In 2013, Cresson's lost gravesite was rediscovered.

Diplomatic career
On May 17, 1844, he was commissioned consul at Jerusalem, the first person to hold this office. However, the commission was recalled before he arrived in Jerusalem, unbeknownst to him. He speaks of his departure for Jerusalem as follows:

He was much affected by the surroundings of Jerusalem, became more inclined toward Judaism, and assumed the name Michoel C. Boaz Israel. In 1844–1848, he was a frequent contributor to Isaac Leeser's magazine, The Occident, in which he criticized the missionary tactics of the London Society for Promoting Christianity Amongst the Jews.

While in Jerusalem he became close to the Sephardic community. He was a friend of Chacham Yehiel Cohen and the next chief rabbi, Elyashar. In 1848, he sought to become a Jew. In March of that year, he was circumcised and converted to Judaism. He returned to Philadelphia in September 1848 to arrange his affairs and move permanently to Jerusalem.

The family tried to keep him from carrying out his plans and claimed he had lost his sanity. He became estranged from all except one son. In May 1849, his wife, Elizabeth and son Jacob applied to the court and had him declared insane. He appealed this decision, and the trial, which went on for six days in May 1851, became one of the famous cases of the time. Eminent counsel were retained on both sides and nearly one hundred witnesses were called. The decision of the lower court was reversed, and Cresson was discharged. The argument of Horatio Hubbell, Jr., one of his lawyers, was published in The Occident in 1863, with comments by Isaac Leeser.

Published works
The Two Witnesses, Moses and Elijah, London, 1844
The Good Olive-Tree, Israel, 1844
 Jerusalem, the Center and Joy of the Whole Earth, Philadelphia, 1844

References

External links
 From Quaker to Jew: The Story of Warder Cresson
 Dreams and Diplomacy in the Holy Land: American Consuls in Jerusalem in the 19th Century. Shapell Manuscript Foundation.
 Cresson's Key of David
 Warder Cresson at Political Graveyard
 Warder Cresson was Accused of Being Insane for Converting to Judaism  Rabbi Menachem Levine, Aish.com

1798 births
1860 deaths
19th-century converts to Judaism
American former Christians
American Sephardic Jews
Jewish American government officials
Converts to Judaism from Protestantism
Expatriates in Ottoman Palestine
19th-century American diplomats